Tullinge torg is a small shopping center in Botkyrka located in central Tullinge, Sweden. Nearby is Tullinge station. Tullinge Torg has over 20 shops including a pizza vendor and a solarium.

History 
Tullinge Torg was built in the 1970s.

Shopping centres in Sweden
Stockholm urban area